Averill Peak is a mountain summit located in the town of Saranac, in Clinton County, New York. It is part of the Adirondack Mountains.

References

Mountains of Clinton County, New York
North American 1000 m summits